Ignorance Never Dies is the second full-length studio album from UK hardcore punk band Your Demise.

The album was released on 20 April 2009, in UK & Europe via Visible Noise Records, followed by a promotional tour of Europe with Deez Nuts and More Than Life.

Track listing

Personnel

Your Demise
 George Noble – vocals
 Stuart Paice – guitar
 Daniel Osborne – guitar
 James Sampson – bass
 James Tailby – drums

Additional personnel
 Marc Aspinal – art conception, design, layout
 Tom Barnes – photography
 Ben Humphreys – engineering

References

2009 albums
Your Demise albums